Demourelles Island is a small island in the Bayou St. John in New Orleans, Louisiana. It is located at 30.00167oN,  -90.08389oW. The bayou at this point is paralleled on both sides by St. Bernard Ave. and Wisner Ave. and crossed by Harrison Ave. The island itself is accessed by Park Island Drive.

References
 http://www.brainygeography.com/features/LA.island/demourellesisland.html

Landforms of Orleans Parish, Louisiana
Islands of Louisiana